Mis Canciones Favoritas (En Concierto Acústico) is a 2003 unplugged acoustic performance by Spanish musician Chenoa released as an album and DVD.

Recorded in April, 2003 in Barcelona, it included some of her favorite songs, such as: Man in the mirror, Respect, Chain of fools or Love of my life. It was released on a limited edition of 100,000 copies for fans.

Track listing

Album
 "Chain of Fools"
 "El Tiempo Que Me Das"
 "Maybe This Time"
 "Love of My Life"
 "Ain't No Sunshine"
 "Man in the Mirror"
 "Cuando Tú Vas"
 "Desnuda Frente A Ti"
 "Lía"
 "Respect"
 "Killing Me Softly"
 "El Centro de Mi Amor"

DVD
 "Chain of Fools"
 "El Tiempo Que Me Das"
 "Maybe This Time"
 "This Can't Be Love"
 "Route 66"
 "Love of My Life"
 "Ain't No Sunshine"
 "Man in the Mirror"
 "Cuando Tú Vas"
 "Desnuda Frente A Tí"
 "Lía"
 "Respect"
 "Killing Me Softly"
 "El Centro de Mi Amor"

Chart performance

References 

Chenoa albums
Chenoa video albums
2003 live albums
2003 video albums
Live video albums